A Photoreflector is a light emitting diode and a phototransistor housed in a compact package that can be used for detection of proximity and colour of objects.

They are a popular component in line following robots and other robotics.

Notes

Diodes
Robotics hardware